An election to the County Council of London took place in March 1901. The "Moderates" decided to contest the elections under the label of "Conservative and Unionist". Liberals and Socialists continued to contest the elections under the "Progressive" label.

Election result

Constituency results

Battersea and Clapham

Bethnal Green

Camberwell

Chelsea

City of London

Deptford

Finsbury

Fulham

Greenwich

Hackney

Hammersmith

Hampstead

Islington

Kensington

Lambeth

Lewisham

Marylebone

Newington

Paddington

St George's Hanover Square

St Pancras

Shoreditch

Southwark

Strand

Tower Hamlets

Wandsworth

Westminster

Woolwich

References

London County Council elections
London
1901 in London
March 1901 events